Clermont Auvergne Métropole is the métropole, an intercommunal structure, centred on the city of Clermont-Ferrand. It is located in the Puy-de-Dôme department, in the Auvergne-Rhône-Alpes region, central France. It was created in January 2018, replacing the communauté urbaine that had replaced the previous communauté d'agglomération Clermont-Communauté in January 2017. Its area is 300.6 km2. Its population was 294,127 in 2018, of which 146,734 in Clermont-Ferrand proper.

Composition
Clermont Auvergne Métropole consists of the following 21 communes:

Aubière
Aulnat
Beaumont
Blanzat
Cébazat
Ceyrat
Chamalières
Châteaugay
Clermont-Ferrand
Cournon-d'Auvergne
Durtol
Gerzat
Le Cendre
Lempdes
Nohanent
Orcines
Pérignat-lès-Sarliève
Pont-du-Château
Romagnat
Royat
Saint-Genès-Champanelle

References

Clermont-Ferrand
Clermont-Ferrand